Renu Saluja (5 July 1952 – 16 August 2000) was an Indian film editor. In the 1980s and 1990s, she worked with both mainstream and art house Hindi cinema directors, including Govind Nihalani, Vidhu Vinod Chopra, Sudhir Mishra, Shekhar Kapoor, Mahesh Bhatt, and Vijay Singh. Her work encompassed multiple feature films, documentaries, short films, and television series.

Renu was a four-time winner of National Film Award for Best Editing for Parinda (1989), Dharavi (1993), Sardar (1993) and Godmother (1999) and won Filmfare Award for best editing for Parinda (1989) and 1942: A Love Story (1994).

Early life and education
Renu was born into a Punjabi family. She applied to the direction program at the Film and Television Institute of India in Pune in 1974, but was not accepted and ended up on the editing program instead. She graduated in 1976 and began a career as a film editor in India, a field dominated by men at the time.

Career
She first edited Vidhu Vinod Chopra's diploma film, Murder at Monkey Hill (1976), for which she also received an Associate Director credit. The film subsequently won the National Film Award for the Best Experimental Film in 1977–78. Once out of the FTII, Renu made her debut with classmate Saeed Akhtar Mirza's Albert Pinto Ko Gussa Kyon Ata Hai (1980), followed by Vidhu Vinod Chopra's Sazaye Maut (1981), then another classmate Kundan Shah's comedy, Jaane Bhi Do Yaaro (1983), where her work received critical acclaim. Her early work was in parallel cinema with her FTII colleagues, Vidhu Vinod Chopra, Saeed Mirza, Kundan Shah, and Ashok Ahuja.

The first offer that Renu got from outside the circle of FTII filmmakers was Govind Nihalani's Ardh Satya, filmed in 1983. After this her career took off, including a stint with Doordarshan.

Chopra's Parinda was among the first mainstream films that Renu edited, and she also assisted direction. Unlike the smaller films which were made in one schedule, with the entire film completed before she started editing, Parinda was a more complex production shot over a period of three years.

In the 1990s Renu was involved in both mainstream cinema and the new crop of independent films that appeared following the success of Hyderabad Blues. Some of the well-known films edited by Renu include Jaane Bhi Do Yaaron (1983), Kabhi Haan Kabhi Naa (1993), Bandit Queen (1995), Jaya Ganga (1996),
Pardes (1997), Rockford (1999) and Hey Ram (2000). Nagesh Kukunoor's Bollywood Calling and finally Calcutta Mail released in 2003 was her last edited film.

Personal life
Her elder sister Radha Saluja was a film actress, who worked in numerous Hindi, Punjabi and other regional films, and younger sister Dr. Kumkum Khadalia is a plastic surgeon. Renu married director Vidhu Vinod Chopra, a fellow FTII alumnus when they graduated in 1976. They later worked together on Jaane Bhi Do Yaaron (1983), where Vinod was the production manager and she was the editor. Even though they later separated, she continued to edit all his films and was his assistant director. Later in life, she became close with director Sudhir Mishra, many of whose films she worked on, including Dharavi and Is Raat Ki Subah Nahin (1996).

She died in Mumbai, on 16 August 2000, after a long bout of stomach cancer.

Legacy
In 2006, GraFTII, the Alumnus association of FTII released a book on her titled, 'Invisible - The Art of Renu Saluja'. In a 2005 interview, noted director, Sudhir Mishra, said that the principal character, Geeta in his acclaimed film, Hazaaron Khwaishein Aisi (2005), "..is the amalgamation of all the spirited women I've known, my tribute to Renu Saluja.". Later in 2006, she became the first editor to have Editing Award named after her.

In June 2009, GRAFTII, an Alumni Association of the FTII and E-City ventures, held a tribute festival of her films, including a documentary in which all the directors Saluja worked with shared their memories of her.

Partial filmography

Awards
 National Film Award
 1990: Best Editing: Parinda
 1992: Best Editing: Dharavi
 1994: Best Editing: Sardar
 1999: Best Editing: Godmother
 Filmfare Award
 1989: Best Editing: Parinda
 1995: Best Editing: 1942: A Love Story
 Star Screen Award
 1996: Best Editing: Is Raat Ki Subah Nahin

Further reading
 Invisible: the art of Renu Saluja. by Chandita Mukherjee and Jethu Mundul. GraFTII, 2006.

References

External links 
 
 Shekhar Kapur on Renu Saluja in his blog
 The nimble tightrope walker (Excerpts from GRAFTII Book, Invisible: the art of Renu Saluja) at Screen (magazine)
 GRAFTII Book, Invisible: the art of Renu Saluja

1952 births
2000 deaths
Film and Television Institute of India alumni
Hindi film editors
Filmfare Awards winners
Punjabi people
Best Editor National Film Award winners
Artists from Mumbai
Artists from Delhi
Film editors from Delhi